The 2019 CECAFA Women's Championship was the fourth edition of the association football tournament for women's national teams in the East African region.

It was held in Dar es Salaam, Tanzania between 16 and 25 November 2019. Kenya won the tournament with a 2–0 win over Tanzania in the final.

Participants and draw

Group A
 (hosts)

Group B

Group stage

Group A

Group B

Knockout stage

Semi-finals

Third-place playoff

Final

Awards
Jentrix Shikangwa from Kenya won the top scorer award with 10 goals. The Golden Glove Award went to Kenyan goalkeeper Annedy Kundu who did not concede a single goal in the whole tournament. 
Tanzania's Mwanahamisi Shurua was voted Most Valuable Player and her team also bagged the Fair Play Award.

References

2019 in women's association football
CECAFA Women's Championship
CECAFE
2019 in African football
International association football competitions hosted by Tanzania